Meet Wally Sparks is a 1997 American comedy film directed by Peter Baldwin, written by Harry Basil and Rodney Dangerfield. It stars Dangerfield in the title role, with Debi Mazar, Michael Weatherly, Cindy Williams, Alan Rachins, Burt Reynolds and David Ogden Stiers costarring.

Plot
Wally Sparks is the host of a sleazy tabloid-style TV talk show who makes Jerry Springer seem gentle by comparison. His show has become so foul that he's alienated his not-especially-discriminating viewers, and his ratings are taking a nosedive.

Lenny Spencer, head of the network carrying his show, gives Wally an ultimatum—he has a week to clean up the content and boost his ratings, or his show gets cancelled.

Wally's producer, Sandy Gallo, comes up with an idea—Floyd Preston is the governor of Georgia and a staunch conservative known for his attacks on the lowbrow content of Wally's show, so what better way to demonstrate that Wally is trying to change his ways than to have Preston on the show as a guest?

In order to persuade Preston to appear, Wally accepts an invitation to a reception at the Governor's Mansion, later learning that the Governor's young son is the fan who sent him the invitation. Wally makes the mistake of participating in a drunken game of strip poker with Preston's wife, Emily, while somehow involving himself in a plot to blackmail the Governor. Further complications ensue when Wally's son, Dean, begins a romantic relationship with the Governor's daughter.

Cast

Main cast

Acting cameos

Cameos as themselves

Release

Box office
Meet Wally Sparks opened in 1,552 venues on January 31, 1997 and ranked number 13 in the domestic box office in its opening weekend, earning $2,131,001. At the end of its run, the film grossed $4,073,582.

Critical reception
The film received largely negative reviews from critics. Review aggregator website Rotten Tomatoes reports that only 13% from 16 reviews gave the film a positive review.

References

External links
 
 
 

1997 films
1997 comedy films
American comedy films
Films set in Atlanta
Films set in Los Angeles
Films shot in California
Films shot in Los Angeles
Films with screenplays by Rodney Dangerfield
Trimark Pictures films
Largo Entertainment films
Films scored by Michel Colombier
1997 directorial debut films
1990s English-language films
Films directed by Peter Baldwin (director)
1990s American films